Mario Bolter (born 1 July 1984) is an Austrian footballer who currently plays as a defensive midfielder for SC Röthis.

External links

1984 births
Living people
Austrian footballers
SC Austria Lustenau players
SW Bregenz players
SC Rheindorf Altach players
FC Lustenau players
Association football midfielders
People from Feldkirch, Vorarlberg
Footballers from Vorarlberg